Santa Rita is a municipality in the Chalatenango department of El Salvador and is one of the largest municipalities of Chalatenango. It has a shoreline on Lake Suchitlán and is bordered by the municipalities of Comalapa, Dulce Nombre de María, Concepción Quetzaltepeque, El Paraíso, and San Rafael.

History 

Official reports record the town of Santa Rita being established in 1822, while according to Colonial Intendant Antonio Gutiérrez y Ulloa, it was established in 1807. Santa Rita was a part of San Salvador from its establishment until 13 May 1833, after which it was transferred to Chalatenango under the administration of Tejutla until being returned to San Salvador on 21 October 1833. In 1835, it was transferred to Cuscatlán and was incorporated into El Salvador in 1841.

On 1 November 1846, General Francisco Malespín defeated Salvadoran soldiers under Joaquín Peralta, who were loyal to President Eugenio Aguilar, in battle in Santa Rita during his war to retake the presidency.  Santa Ana transferred a final time to Chalatenango in 1855. It was dissolved on 12 May 1902 and transferred to Dulce Nombre de María on the executive decree of President Tomás Regalado.  President Pedro José Escalón reestablished the municipality through an executive decree on 28 April 1903. Another law was passed on 15 July 1919 that reinforced the existence of Santa Rita as separate from both Tejutla and Dulce Nombre de María.

On 17 March 1982, four Dutch journalists and four guerrillas of the Farabundo Martí National Liberation Front (FMLN) were massacred on the road from El Paraíso to Santa Rita by the Atonal Battalion during the Salvadoran Civil War.

Geography 

Santa Rita has an elevation of 1,257 feet or 383 meters and is 20.52 square miles or 53.14 square kilometers large. According to Global Forest Watch, from 2001 to 2019, the municipality lost 310 hectares of tree cover, which was a decrease of 18%.

Population 

Santa Rita had a population of 1,090 in 1890 and a population of 2,241 in 1956. In the 2007 census, Santa Rita had a population of 5,985 people, with only 400 or 6.7% living in urban areas and the remainder living in rural areas. There were 1,498 occupied homes with an average of 6 people per household. As of 2020, the municipality had a population of 7,367.

Administrative divisions 

Santa Rita is divided into four cantons and three caserios:

Barillas
El Chilamate

San Nicolás Piedras Gordas
El Tronconal
La Rastra
Tasajera
Tobías

Mayors of Santa Rita 

The current mayor of Santa Rita is Ismael Romero Gutiérrez of the Nationalist Republican Alliance (ARENA).

See also 

Dulce Nombre de María

References

Citations

Bibliography

External links 

Official municipal Facebook page

Municipalities of the Chalatenango Department